Anachevo (Änäs) is a rural locality (a village) in Andreyevsky Selsoviet, Ilishevsky District, Bashkortostan, Russia. The population was 324 as of 2010. There are 4 streets.

Geography 
Anachevo is located 32 km north of Verkhneyarkeyevo (the district's administrative centre) by road. Andreyevka is the nearest rural locality.

References 

Rural localities in Ilishevsky District